My Last Round is a 2010 Chilean-Argentine drama film directed by Julio Jorquera. The film premiered at the 2010 Valdivia International Film Festival.

Plot 
A love story between a boxer (played by Roberto Farías) and a young kitchen assistant (played by Héctor Morales) begins in southern Chile. When discouragement becomes a part of their lives, they set out on a journey to the capital in hopes of making their dream come true. The struggle for an opportunity can either be a way out or, ultimately, their last chance.

Cast 
 Roberto Farías as Octavio
 Héctor Morales as Hugo
 Manuela Martelli as Jennifer
 Tamara Acosta as Matilde
  as Ximena
 Alejandro Trejo as Don Carlos
  as Emiliano
 Gonzalo Robles as Don Chalo
 Ariel Mateluna as Lanza

References

External links 

2010 drama films
2010 films
Argentine LGBT-related films
Chilean LGBT-related films
Argentine drama films
Chilean drama films
2010s Argentine films
2010s Chilean films